Dorrigo is a place in New South Wales, Australia; it may refer to:

 Dorrigo Plateau, Northern Tablelands
 Dorrigo, New South Wales, town on the Dorrigo Plateau
 Dorrigo National Park, on the Dorrigo Plateau
 Dorrigo railway line, largely defunct railway line terminating at Dorrigo
 Dorrigo Steam Railway and Museum, privately owned collection of railway equipment
 Dorrigo Pepper (Tasmannia stipitata), rainforest shrub
 Dorrigo Plum (Endiandra introrsa), rainforest tree